Sounds of Violence is the fifth studio album by English thrash metal band Onslaught, released on 28 January 2011 through AFM Records in Europe and 8 February in North America. This was Onslaught's first album not to feature a new singer, as Sy Keeler remained with the band after their previous album Killing Peace. In addition to standard CD formats, Sounds of Violence was also released on limited black vinyl (only 666 copies) in a gatefold sleeve and a Limited Digipack. For the Japanese release the album also featured a re-recording of "Angels of Death" and "Thermonuclear Devastation" taken from their debut album Power from Hell. Sounds of Violence outsold the previous album Killing Peace in less than one year. In February 2012, the band has been listed by the webzine Metal Storm as the sixth best Thrash Metal Album of 2011.

Track listing

Personnel 
Sy Keeler - vocals 
Nige Rockett - guitar
Andy Rosser-Davies - guitar 
Jeff Williams - bass  
Steve Grice - drums

References 

2011 albums
Onslaught (band) albums
AFM Records albums